Anton Hrnko (born 31 January 1955 in Žilina, Czechoslovakia) is a Slovak historian and politician; a member of the Slovak National Party; and a former member of the National Council of Slovakia.

He was formerly a member of Czechoslovakia's communist party.

On 10 March 2019 his wife Blanka, son Martin and daughter Michala were passengers on Ethiopian Airlines Flight 302, which crashed shortly after take-off, resulting in the deaths of all those on board.

He was a co-author of the book "" ("Slovak history from dawn to present").

Works

References

External links 

 

Living people
Members of the National Council (Slovakia) 1992-1994
Members of the National Council (Slovakia) 1994-1998
Members of the National Council (Slovakia) 2016-2020
Slovak National Party politicians
1955 births
21st-century Slovak historians
Slovak male writers
21st-century male writers
People from Žilina